Pomachromis is a genus of fish in the family Pomacentridae.

Species
Pomachromis exilis (Allen and Emery, 1973)  
Pomachromis fuscidorsalis  Allen & Randall, 1974 
Pomachromis guamensis Allen and Larson, 1975    
Pomachromis richardsoni (Snyder, 1909)

References

Pomacentrinae
Marine fish genera
Taxa named by Gerald R. Allen
Taxa named by John Ernest Randall